Ömeriye Mosque ( Temenos Omerié), is a mosque in the walled city of Nicosia on the island of Cyprus, currently located in the south section of Nicosia. Following the Turkish invasion of Cyprus, the mosque gained significance as one of the most important sites of Muslim worship in the non-Muslim section of the island and the city.

Currently the mosque is functioning and open for both worshipers and visitors.

History
Formerly, the site of the mosque was occupied by the Augustinian Church of Saint Mary, which dated back to the  14th century. During the Ottoman-Venetian War of 1570–73, the church was first heavily damaged during the siege of Nicosia in 1570, and was eventually levelled after the war.

After the Turkish conquest of Cyprus, Lala Mustafa Pasha, the Ottoman commander, ordered a mosque to be built on the site of the former church, based on a popular belief that Umar, second caliph of Islam, was buried at this site in 7th century.

According to Turkish Cypriot folklore, the Ömeriye Mosque is the first mosque where Turks prayed on the island following its conquest in 1571.

Current status
Currently, mosque is active and open for both worshipers and tourists. Today, it is mostly used by the Muslim visitors coming to Republic of Cyprus' south section for tourism or business purposes, mainly from neighboring Arab countries and Balkans. Also, Turkish Cypriots who cross to the south section of Nicosia use the mosque during their daily trips.

On 3 June 2014, Turkish Cypriot Director of Religious Affairs, Talip Atalay, visited the Ömeriye mosque during a trip of visiting several sacred Muslim spots located in the south section of Cyprus, following an invitation from Archbishop Chrysostomos II of Cyprus as part of the Religious Track of the Cyprus Peace Process, under the auspices of the Embassy of Sweden in Nicosia. Atalay was accompanied by the EVKAF Foundation’s Chairperson Rauf Ersenal, a native of Tahtakale neighbourhood, whose family fled the area following the 1963 intercommunal violence, never to return.

Architecture

The construction of the mosque followed a similar groundsplan to the former church, however building of the mosque was conducted in the Islamic style. It nicely exhibits the characteristics of the Ottoman-Turkish architecture with varying elements, such as arches, small domes and a tall Turkish-style minaret easily visible from a distance.

Ömeriye Hamam
The area doesn't only include the mosque. Across the street, there is a Turkish bath (hamam) located, named Ömeriye Hamam. The construction of the hamam (bath) was also ordered by Lala Mustafa Pasha.

The bath was in framework of the fundings provided by the EU and it functioned as a touristic attraction also open for bathing until 2012. Government of Cyprus stated the closure of the bath was for renovation plans and efforts.

See also
 Ottoman Cyprus
 Islam in Cyprus
 List of mosques in Cyprus
 Turkish Republic of Northern Cyprus
 North Nicosia

References

Mosques in Nicosia
Tourist attractions in Nicosia
Ottoman architecture in Cyprus
16th-century mosques